The Ismaning Open was a tournament for female professional tennis players played on indoor carpet courts. The event was classified as a 10K ITF Women's Circuit tournament, however has previously had larger prize money. It was held in Ismaning, Germany, from 2006 to 2016.

Past finals

Singles

Doubles

External links
ITF search
Official Website 

ITF Women's World Tennis Tour
Carpet court tennis tournaments
Recurring sporting events established in 2006
Tennis tournaments in Germany
Recurring sporting events disestablished in 2016
Defunct tennis tournaments in Germany